S Line may refer to:

Rail transportation
 S-Bahn, a type of hybrid urban and suburban railway.
 S-train (Copenhagen), an urban rail network in Copenhagen, Denmark
 Milan S Lines, a commuter rail network in Milan, Italy
 S-Line (CSX), the former mainline of the Seaboard Air Line Railroad, now owned by CSX Transportation
 S-Line (Norfolk Southern), a railroad line running between North Carolina and Tennessee operated by the Norfolk Southern Railway in the United States
 S Line, a commuter rail line serving Seattle, Washington, United States
 S Castro Shuttle, a Muni Metro line in San Francisco, California, United States
 S (New York City Subway service), a subway shuttle service in New York City, New York, United States
 S Line (Utah Transit Authority), a streetcar connecting the cities of Salt Lake City and South Salt Lake that is operated by the Utah Transit Authority in Utah, United States
 S (Los Angeles Railway), a former streetcar service in Los Angeles, California

Other uses
 Audi S line, an optional sports trim packages available on various Audi cars
 S Line (ice hockey), a forward line for the Montreal Maroons, a former NHL hockey team